The 2020 Southland Conference men's basketball tournament is the postseason men's basketball tournament for the 2019–20 season in the Southland Conference. The tournament was scheduled from March 11–14, 2020.  The first two games of the tournament were held at the Merrell Center in Katy, Texas on March 11, 2020.  On March 12, the Southland Conference announced the remainder of the tournament would be canceled due to the COVID-19 pandemic. The tournament winner would have received an automatic invitation to the 2020 NCAA Division I men's basketball tournament.

Seeds
Teams were seeded by record within the conference, with a tie–breaker system to seed teams with identical conference records. Only the top eight teams in the conference qualified for the tournament. The top two seeds received double byes into the semifinals in the merit-based format. The No. 3 and No. 4 seeds received single byes to the quarterfinals.

Schedule
Tournament cancelled on March 12

Source

Bracket
Tournament cancelled on March 12.

Awards and honors
Tournament MVP: All-Tournament Team:'''

 
 
 
 

Source:

See also
 2020 Southland Conference women's basketball tournament

References

External links
 2020 Southland Conference Basketball Tournament

Tournament
Southland Conference men's basketball tournament
Southland Conference men's basketball tournament
Southland Conference men's basketball tournament
Southland Conference men's basketball tournament
Sports competitions in Katy, Texas
College basketball tournaments in Texas